Malapterurus melanochir is a species of electric catfish endemic to the Democratic Republic of the Congo, where it occurs in the upper and middle Congo River basin. This species grows to a length of  SL.

References

Malapteruridae
Freshwater fish of Africa
Fish of the Democratic Republic of the Congo
Endemic fauna of the Democratic Republic of the Congo
Taxa named by Steven Mark Norris
Fish described in 2002
Strongly electric fish